Horrorshow is an Australian hip-hop music duo from the Inner West region of Sydney that consists of producer Adit and rapper MC Solo. Horrorshow, together with Spit Syndicate, Jackie Onassis and Joyride, are members of One Day collective. Horrorshow are recognised as pioneers of the sub genre known as "Aussie hip-hop," alongside Illy, Drapht, Bliss n Eso, and Hilltop Hoods.

Horrorshow has appeared at major Australian music festivals, including the Big Day Out, Splendour in the Grass and Groovin' the Moo.

History

2006–2011:The Grey Space and Inside Story
After signing with the Elefant Traks label, the pair released their debut album The Grey Space, an album created largely during the duo's high school years, at a time where they linked up with Spit Syndicate and Joyride to form the extended One Day crew. Elefant Traks artist and co-founder Urthboy explained the duo's recruitment in a blog post published in the lead-up to the release of Horrorshow's third album:

When Horrorshow brought me The Grey Space I deduced that they were fans of Atmosphere. They wouldn’t put "Walk You Home" on it, making the better decision to keep it for their unfinished second album, despite my wishes at the time. The first " we wanna join the Elefants " conversation I had with them took place on the balcony at our studio/office at the time in Enmore. I remember telling them that the only way Elefant Traks could develop was if the likes of Horrorshow took the possibilities opened up by The Herd and amplify them.

The Grey Space was nominated for an award at the ARIA Music Awards of 2009. The band completed tours with The Herd, Muph & Plutonic and Hermitude.

After the release of their debut followed their second album Inside Story in 2009, which was acclaimed amongst their fans for its eloquent lyricism and soulful production. It was chosen as a Triple J Feature Album, FBi Album of the Week and was also favourably received by Australian music critics.

2012–2015: King Amongst Many
In 2012, Horrorshow again supported the Hilltop Hoods on a European tour and continued in this role for the Hilltop Hoods' "Speaking in Tongues" Australian tour. The band was included in the line-up for the 2012 Brisbane Festival and performed at the Spiegeltent venue.

An indication of Horrorshow's third album was revealed with a song entitled "Did You Hear?", which features a horns section. On 22 December 2012, a confirmation of the third album's 2013 release was posted on the group's Facebook fan page. In early May 2013, another song "Unfair Lottery" was released on the Internet and received radio airplay. The song was made officially available in a digital format on 24 May 2013 and appears on Horrorshow's third album. The subject of "Unfair Lottery" is concerned with the racial notion of "white privilege". The music video for "Unfair Lottery" premiered on Channel V's "WTF" programme on 5 June 2013.

The band revealed the name of their third album King Amongst Many on 13 June 2013, following the rapid sale of tickets for the "Unfair Lottery" single launch shows. An album release date of 2 August 2013 was subsequently publicised in the promotional material for the Australian 'King Amongst Many Tour' that spans from September to November 2013.

King Amongst Many was featured as 'Album of the Week' on Australia's Triple J radio station and feature album on Sydney, Australia community radio station FBi.

2016–2020: Bardo State 
The first indication of a fourth album from the duo came in August 2016, with the release of a new single, 'If You Know What I Mean', accompanied by a video clip and tour announcement. This was followed by the melancholy yet uplifting track 'Push', which featured vocals from 16-year-old Taj Ralph. On 30 January 2017, Horrorshow announced that their fourth full-length release, Bardo State, would be released on 24 February.  The album title "references The Tibetan Book of the Dead (or Bardo Thodol) and the duo wove concepts of the text into the album making process."

2020-2022: I Won't Give You Up & Good Problems 
On 15 April 2022, Horrorshow announced the released of their forthcoming EP Good Problems.

Discography

Studio albums

Live albums

Extended plays

Singles

Other certified songs

Awards and nominations

AIR Awards
The Australian Independent Record Awards (commonly known informally as AIR Awards) is an annual awards night to recognise, promote and celebrate the success of Australia's Independent Music sector.

! 
|-
| AIR Awards of 2010
|Inside Story 
| Best Independent Hip Hop/Urban Album
| 
| 
|-
| AIR Awards of 2014
|King Amongst Many 
| Best Independent Hip Hop/Urban Album
| 
| 
|-
| AIR Awards of 2018
| Bardo State
| Best Independent Hip Hop/Urban Album
| 
| 
|-
| AIR Awards of 2020
| New Normal
| Best Independent Hip Hop/Urban Album
| 
| 
|-
| AIR Awards of 2021
| New Normal (Deluxe)
| Best Independent Hip Hop Album or EP
| 
| 
|}

ARIA Music Awards
The ARIA Music Awards is an annual awards ceremony that recognises excellence, innovation, and achievement across all genres of Australian music. 

! 
|-
| 2009
|The Grey Space 
| Best Urban Album
| 
|
|-
| 2013
|King Amongst Many 
| Best Urban Album
| 
|
|-

Australian Music Prize
The Australian Music Prize (the AMP) is an annual award of $30,000 given to an Australian band or solo artist in recognition of the merit of an album released during the year of award. The commenced in 2005.

! 
|-
| 2013
| King Amongst Many
| Australian Music Prize
| 
| 
|-

J Award
The J Awards are an annual series of Australian music awards that were established by the Australian Broadcasting Corporation's youth-focused radio station Triple J. They commenced in 2005.

! 
|-
| J Awards of 2013
|King Amongst Many
| Australian Album of the Year
| 
|

References

Australian hip hop groups
Hip hop duos